A by-election for the seat of Stuart in the Northern Territory Legislative Assembly was held on 28 September 1996. The by-election was triggered by the resignation of Labor (ALP) member and Leader of the Opposition Brian Ede. The seat had been held by Ede since 1983.

The ALP selected Peter Toyne as its candidate. The CLP candidate was Tony Bohning, a former Superintendent of Alice Springs Jail.

Results

References

1996 elections in Australia
Northern Territory by-elections
1990s in the Northern Territory